The Torso Murder: The Untold Story of Evelyn Dick is a non-fiction book written by Brian Vallée.  It was published in 2001 by Key Porter.  The book focuses on the Evelyn Dick murder trial and the subsequent disappearance of Dick. The 1946-1947 murder trials of Dick is one of the most publicized events in criminal history in Canada.

Adaptations
On March 18, 2002 Torso: The Evelyn Dick Story a made-for-TV film aired on Canadian television. In 2002 Brian Vallée also assisted in the production of The Notorious Mrs. Dick a Real to Reel Productions documentary for CTV.

External links
 Official Website
 Torso Murder (Evelyn Dick) series in the Brian Vallée archival fonds

References

2001 non-fiction books
Canadian non-fiction books
Canadian novels adapted into films